Polypus is a fungal genus of uncertain familial placement in the order Russulales. A monotypic genus, it contains the single species Polypus dispansus, originally described by Curtis Gates Lloyd in 1912 as a species of Polyporus. Polypus was circumscribed by Serge Audet in 2010.

References

Russulales
Russulales genera
Taxa described in 2010